Kameshkovo is a town and the administrative center of Kameshkovsky District in Vladimir Oblast, Russia, located  northeast of Vladimir, the administrative center of the oblast. As of the 2021 Census, its population was 12,028.

History
It was founded in the beginning of the 20th century as a settlement around a spinning-and-weaving factory. It was granted town status on July 12, 1951.

Administrative and municipal status
Within the framework of administrative divisions, Kameshkovo serves as the administrative center of Kameshkovsky District, to which it is directly subordinated. As a municipal division, the town of Kameshkovo is incorporated within Kameshkovsky Municipal District as Kameshkovo Urban Settlement.

Transportation
There is a railway station in the town.

References

Notes

Sources

External links

Official website of Kameshkovo 
Kameshkovo Business Directory 

Cities and towns in Vladimir Oblast
Monotowns in Russia
Kovrovsky Uyezd